Miko Lim (born January 6, 1980) is an American film director and photographer. He is best known for directing commercials for Adidas, Nike, and Oakley with athletes including Patrick Mahomes, Leo Messi, and Russell Westbrook. His work has been recognized by major industry trades and award shows, including Cannes and the International Muse Creative Awards. For his work on Ocean Mother, a documentary short, he received a Bronze Clio Award for Best Direction as well as a Shots Awards shortlist nomination and multiple film festival selections.

Biography
Lim was born in Tawau, Malaysia, and was raised in Seattle, Washington, where he attended Garfield High School. After completing his education at Pomona College in Claremont, California, he developed his photography and filmmaking work while living in New York, Paris, and Tokyo. Lim is an active member of the climbing and outdoors community.

Career  
Lim has directed and photographed numerous advertising campaigns for Nike, Adidas, Puma, and Mountain Dew, among many others. His major advertising work began with Champion's How You Play campaign working with advertising agency Kaplan Thaler Group. Lim has shot numerous covers for ESPN Magazine, Outside, GQ, Rolling Stone, and Vogue. In 2017, Lim co-founded photography and filmmaking collaborative Cardboard Projects to create visual content for multiple brands.

Lim has filmed many celebrities and professional athletes, including Jay-Z, Michael Jordan, Leo Messi, Russell Westbrook, Patrick Mahomes, Diplo, Lil Wayne, Wiz Khalifa, Anthony Davis, Paul Pogba, Kevin Jorgeson, Joel Embiid, Von Miller, JuJu Smith-Schuster, and Nina Williams.

In 2010, Lim created and published his first book, We Are The Only Ones, after visiting The Raleigh Hotel in Miami, Florida before it was shut down.

Lim is currently signed with Venice-based production company Farm League for commercial and film representation.

Books
 We Are The Only Ones, 2010

References

External links
 
 Farm League Film Company

American photographers
Fashion photographers
Malaysian emigrants to the United States
Commercial photographers
Pomona College alumni
Living people
1980 births
Garfield High School (Seattle) alumni